Edward Wheeler may refer to:

Sir Oliver Wheeler (Edward Oliver Wheeler, 1890–1962), Canadian soldier 
Percy Charles Edward d'Erf Wheeler (1859–1944), English medical missionary
Billy Edd Wheeler (Billy Edward Wheeler, born 1932), American songwriter, performer and writer
Ted Wheeler (Edward Tevis Wheeler, born 1962), American politician from Oregon
Ed Wheeler (1940s infielder) (Edward Raymond Wheeler, 1915–1983), baseball infielder
 Edward Lytton Wheeler (1854/55–1885), American dime novelist

See also
Edward Wheeler Scripture (1864–1945), American physician and psychologist